The women's 3000 metres event  at the 2000 European Athletics Indoor Championships was held on February 25–27.

Medalists

Results

Heats
First 4 of each heat (Q) and the next 4 fastest (q) qualified for the final.

Final

References
Results

3000 metres at the European Athletics Indoor Championships
3000
2000 in women's athletics